Maloja District is a former administrative district in the canton of Graubünden (or Grigioni), Switzerland. It was replaced with the Maloja Region on 1 January 2017 as part of a reorganization of the Canton.

It was trilingual, with official languages used by municipalities inside the district being, in order of dominance, German, Italian, and Romansh.

It consisted of two Kreis or circoli in Italian (sub-districts) and sixteen municipalities:

Languages
All three of Graubünden's official languages:  German, Romansh, and Italian, can be heard in the district.  Except for the municipality of Bregaglia, the area was predominantly Romansh-speaking.  Today, Romansh is spoken the least out of the three official languages of Maloja.

References

Districts of Graubünden
Engadin